Qaladərəsi is a village in the municipality of Keçmədin in the Shamakhi Rayon of Azerbaijan.

References

Populated places in Shamakhi District